Miguel Ángel Fraga Licona (born 3 September 1987) is a Mexican professional footballer who plays as a goalkeeper. He was part of the Mexico national team at the 2017 CONCACAF Gold Cup as the 3rd option.

References

External links

1987 births
Living people
Sportspeople from Morelia
Footballers from Michoacán
Mexican footballers
Association football goalkeepers
2017 CONCACAF Gold Cup players
Atlético Morelia players
C.F. Mérida footballers
Club Tijuana footballers
Toros Neza footballers
Querétaro F.C. footballers
Atlas F.C. footballers
Liga MX players